Walk, Don't Run is the soundtrack to the 1966 film of the same name composed by Quincy Jones. It was orchestrated by Jack Hayes and Leo Shuken. Allmusic's Stephen Cook describes the score as having a "Henry Mancini inspired sound", with "excellent contributions from Toots Thielemans and Harry "Sweets" Edison". Jones collaborated with Peggy Lee on the songs "Happy Feet" and "Stay with Me". Jones was recommended to score the film for Cary Grant, who had met him through Lee.

Track listing
 "Happy Feet" – 2:13
 "Stay with Me" – 2:57
 "Copy Cat (Wack a Do)" – 2:59
 "Happy Feet - vocal" – 1:47
 "Papa San" – 1:50
 "Abso-Bleedin'-Lutely" – 2:50
 "Stay with Me - vocal" – 2:22
 "One More Time" – 2:49
 "20th Century Drawers" – 3:10
 "Locked Out" – 2:15
 "Happy Feet - reprise" – 1:43
 "Rabelaisian Rutland" – 1:49
 "One More Time - reprise" – 0:46

Personnel

Performance
Quincy Jones – composer, conductor
Toots Thielemans – harmonica, whistles
Harry "Sweets" Edison – trumpet
Bud Shank – reeds
Earl Palmer – drums
Carol Kaye – electric bass
Emil Richards – percussion
Don Elliot Voices – vocals on "Happy Feet"
Tony Clementi – vocals on "Stay with Me"
Jack Hayes, Leo Shuken – orchestrations
Richard Hazard – vocal orchestrations

References

1966 soundtrack albums
Jazz soundtracks
Mainstream Records soundtracks
Quincy Jones soundtracks